Kirillovka is a rural locality (a village) in Rassvetovsky Selsoviet, Belebeyevsky District, Bashkortostan, Russia. The population was 211 as of 2010. There are 3 streets.

Geography 
Kirillovka is located 16 km west of Belebey (the district's administrative centre) by road. Durasovo is the nearest rural locality.

References 

Rural localities in Belebeyevsky District